Bob and Mike Bryan were the defending champions, but lost in the semifinals to Julio Peralta and Horacio Zeballos.

Peralta and Zeballos went on to win the title, defeating Dustin Brown and Frances Tiafoe in the final, 4–6, 7–5, [10–6].

Seeds

Draw

Draw

References
Main draw

Doubles